Leo Andy (born December 9, 1938 in Capesterre-Belle-Eau, Guadeloupe) is a politician from Guadeloupe who was elected to the French National Assembly in 1995.

References
 page on the French National Assembly website 

1938 births
Living people
People from Capesterre-Belle-Eau
Guadeloupean politicians
Socialist Party (France) politicians
Deputies of the 10th National Assembly of the French Fifth Republic
Deputies of the 11th National Assembly of the French Fifth Republic
20th-century French politicians